The Removal of Restrictions on Political, Civil, and Religious Liberties, also known as the (SCAPIN-93) directive, the "Human Rights Directive", or "Civil Liberties Directive", was a directive issued by the Supreme Commander for the Allied Powers on October 4, 1945 during the Occupation of Japan. The directive mandated the abolition of laws preventing criticism of the Japanese Imperial system, repealing fifteen existing laws, including the Peace Preservation Law and the Thought Control Law (Ideological Prisoner Custody and Surveillance Law), and releasing all political prisoners.

The purpose of the Removal of Restrictions was to dismantle the oppressive policies that were imposed on the Japanese citizenry before the end of World War II. The directive led to the repealing of the Peace Preservation Law, the freedom to criticize the Emperor of Japan, and the release of 3,000 political prisoners. 

Prime Minister Naruhiko Higashikuni resigned five days after the directive was issued because he was not able to implement the reforms stipulated. His successor, Kijūrō Shidehara, released 3,000 political prisoners, and abolished the "Thought Control Law" and 15 other laws and statutes.

References

Japanese governmental reforms
Postwar Japan
1945 establishments in Japan
1945 documents
1945 in law